CICW-FM is a radio station broadcasting community radio programming and a variety of music on the frequency of 101.1 MHz in Elora and Fergus located in Centre Wellington, Ontario, Canada. The station's branding is The Grand @ 101.

History
Centre Wellington Community Radio Inc. was founded in 2009 by Scott Jensen, Vic Folliott and Bill Valedis.

On April 29, 2011, Centre Wellington Community Radio Inc. received Canadian Radio-television and Telecommunications Commission (CRTC) approval to operate a community FM radio station at 92.9 MHz in Centre Wellington, Ontario. On September 12, 2011, Central Wellington Community Radio applied for a technical amendment - contours. On October 28, 2011, the CRTC approved Centre Wellington Community Radio Inc.'s application to decrease the average effective radiated power from 85 to 46 watts, decrease the maximum ERP from 200 to 150 watts, decrease the antenna's effective height above average terrain from 54.2 to 49.1 metres and relocate the antenna and transmitter site.

On September 25, 2014, the station applied to change CICW-FM's frequency from 92.9 MHz to 101.1 MHz and increase the average effective radiated power (ERP) from 45 to 750 watts (maximum ERP from 150 to 2,500 watts). The CRTC approved CWCR's application on September 10, 2015.

According to their Facebook page, the station moved to 101.1 MHz in late 2015. On March 28, 2016 at 6:00 AM, CICW became Grand 101 when the switch in frequency officially took place. The call letters remain CICW-FM.

References

External links
The Grand @ 101

ICW
ICW
Centre Wellington
Radio stations established in 2011
2011 establishments in Ontario